The Wodonga Football Netball Club, nicknamed the Bulldogs, is an Australian rules football and netball club based in the city of Wodonga, Victoria.

History

Wodonga's first recorded match was against the Albury Football Club on Saturday, 6 July 1878 in Wodonga. Between 1878 and 1891, Wodonga played many intermittent friendly matches against other local club's and towns, before organised fixtures and competitions were starting to be arranged from the early 1890s.

In 1886, the Wodonga Junior Football Club played Chiltern in a very rough match, with T Powell captaining the winning Wodonga side and in 1887, Wodonga Junior's journeyed to and were beaten by Chiltern. Walter Pemberton captained the side.

In 1891, Wodonga "Starlights" played in a series of matches against Albury United, Chiltern, Osborne's Flat and Wagga Wagga.

In 1893 Wodonga played in a series of matches against, Albury, Barnawartha, Corowa Federals, Osborne's Flat and Wangaratta.

At the club's 1895 Annual General Meeting at the Terminus Hotel, the following gentlemen were voted in – Mr. R H Smyth (President), Mr. George Bodycomb (Honorary Secretary) and Mr. George Leighton (Honorary Treasurer).

In 1899, the Wodonga FC – "Starlights" junior club was reformed and adopted the club colours of blue, black and a white star. The club patrons were Joseph Hoddinott MLA, and Isaac Isaacs MLA. This team went on to win the Fagan Trophy premiership (Donor – Chris Fagan – Market Hotel, Albury).

In 1900, the Wodonga FC – "Starlights" played in the Albury Football Association and finished in third position.

In 1903, 1904 and 1905, the Wodonga FC – "Shamrocks" entered a team in the local Federal Junior Football Association. They were runners up to the Albury "Endeavours" in 1904 and to the "Britons" in 1905.

In April 1906, the Wodonga FC – "Shamrocks" met and decided to become a senior team and be known as just the Wodonga FC.

The Wodonga FC senior team played in the Border Football Association (BFA) in 1901, 1902, 1903 and also in 1906. In May, 1907 the BFA was wound up after being in debt and "in a state of muddle".

Wodonga FC played in the Wednesday Half Holiday Football Association in 1908 and were runners up to the Albury Catholic Young Men's FC (CYM) on the Albury Sports Ground.

After winning the 1909 – Twomey / Stewart Football Association Premiership, in early 1910, Wodonga FC attempted to form a local football association, but due to a lack of commitment, Wodonga FC were left with no official competition in 1910. They did manage to play some friendly matches with other local clubs during the 1910 season.

In 1911, Wodonga FC applied to both the Ovens & Murray Junior Football Association and the Rutherglen & District Football Association to play in these competitions, but were both rejected due to other club's opinion that the travel would be too far. In 1911 Wodonga played their home matches at Wodonga Park. The Albury Senior Football Association was established in 1911, in which Wodonga FC entered and were runners up to the Catholic Young Men's FC (CYM) again!

The club first played in the Chiltern & District Football Association in 1912 (runners up), 1913 and 1915 and also from 1930 to 1935, prior to joining the Ovens & Murray League in 1936.

In 1913 the club arranged for 100 membership tickets to be printed in the club colours - blue and black!

In 1914, Wodonga FC played in the Wodonga and District Football Association against - Bethanga, Federal Railways, Sandy Creek and Tallangatta. Wodonga finished second on the ladder to premiers, Federal Railways.

In 1914, the Wodonga Military FC was formed, with W Twomey appointed as President. They played matches against Albury Battery FC and Albury Infantry FC in 1914 and 1915.

In 1917 the Wodonga Cadets played the Chiltern Cadets in three games of football.

In 1921, Wodonga lost to Diggers in the Albury & Border Football Association Preliminary Final. In 1921 Wodonga had both an A team and a B team, with the B team playing their first game against Bowna at the Racecourse Oval.

At the club's 1924 AGM, under financial difficulties, the Wodonga FC applied for admission into the Kiewa Football Association, but were rejected. It appears that the Wodonga FC went into recess at this time, mainly due to a lack of community support and financial debt.

In 1924, the Wodonga Rovers FC was formed and this new club entered the Chiltern & District Football Association and had a reasonable amount of success, winning a premiership in 1926 and being runners up in 1927 (minor premiers) and 1928.

At a meeting of the Wodonga Rovers FC on Tuesday, 16 April 1929, the committee voted to alter the club's name to the "Wodonga Football Club" and entered the Tallangatta Football Association, for one year, then returns to the Chiltern & DFL in 1930.

In 1932, Wodonga's H. Scott shared the Chiltern & DFL best and fairest trophy, with Arthur Costin - Howlong FC.

In the 1933 Chiltern and District Football League's grand final, Wodonga defeated Beechworth Wanderers. Wodonga's Clive Bohr was judged as the best and fairest player in the grand final.

In 1934 C W Randell, donated a gold medal for the club's best and fairest winner, which was won by ?

At the start of the 1935 season, Wodonga FC applied for a clearance from the Chiltern & DFL to the Albury District Football League, but were refused. They remained in the Chiltern & DFL and went onto win the premiership, defeating Kiewa at Barnawartha on Saturday, 26 October. Wodonga remained undefeated throughout the year, winning 24 consecutive matches in a very long season!

In 1936 the club order 24 white felt monograms for the club jumpers, with WFC on them. and in 1937 they were known as the "Maroons".

In 1936 and 1937, Colin Wilcox from Wodonga FC played reserves with Melbourne Football Club, before moving across to Williamstown Football Club, where he played 173 games, was a premiership player in 1939, 1945 and 1949. He won the 1938 and 1948 best and fairest and was later selected in Williamstown's Team of the Century on the half back flank. He served in World War II with the RAAF.

The club joined the Ovens & Murray League in 1936 after a committee meeting on Monday, 23 March 1936. Wodonga FC finished third, losing the preliminary final to eventual premiers, Wangaratta Football Club. Crackerjack full forward, Fred Matthews, who kicked 113 goals in Wodonga's 1935 Chiltern and District Football Association premiership year, then kicked 123 goals for Wodonga in 1936. Fred was signed by the Melbourne Football Club and played three reserves games with them in early 1937, kicking 29 goals. Matthews coached Barnawartha in 1938, before returning to Wodonga and played in their 1939 O&MFL grand final loss to Albury. He would later die in World War II in 1943, while serving his country with the RAAF, when his Wellington Bomber plane went down in a fierce snowstorm in England.

In 1940, Wodonga entered a second eighteen team in the Chiltern and District Football Association and lost the first semi final to Barnawartha Football Club. The Chiltern & DFA then went into recess between 1941 and 1944 due to World War II.

In 1945, the Wodonga Football Club entered a team in the Border Football Association and competed against other local clubs, Catholic Young Men, East Albury, Lavington, North Albury and South Albury. Wodonga were defeated by South Albury in the grand final at the Albury Sportsground. Dudley "Doug" Probyn (Captain / Coach) won the club best and fairest award and the Border Mail Medal in 1945.

In 1946, the Ovens and Murray Football League reformed and Wodonga rejoined along with the following club's - Albury, Benalla, Border United, Rutherglen, Wangaratta and Yarrawonga. Wodonga lost the Preliminary Final to Albury on the Wangaratta Showgrounds to finish third in their return to the O&MFL.

There appears to be no Wodonga team in the Chiltern & DFA in 1945 and 1946, but in 1947 there was a Wodonga Ex Servicemen's Football Club that played in the Chiltern and District Football Association and lost the Preliminary Final to Howlong at Lavington. Then in 1948, Wodonga Rovers Football Club reformed and they played in the Chiltern and District Football Association and lost the preliminary final to the Howlong Football Club. Both these teams were not directing related to the Wodonga FC, but it does indicate that football in Wodonga was getting stronger after the war, to warrant having two senior teams in the town. Wodonga Rovers competed in the Chiltern & DFA between 1948 and 1952. In 1953 when the Ovens & Murray League introduced a Seconds football competition, Wodonga Rovers left the Chiltern & DFA and entered the O&MFL Seconds as "Wodonga".

Around 1949, Wodonga FC set up a Provident Fund for injured players to be compensated if they were not able to work for a length of time.

In 1953, the Wodonga "Thirds" won the Albury Midgets Football League Under 15 premiership when they defeated West Albury.

In March 1954, the Wodonga FC decided to enter a third team in the Albury and Border Junior Football League and the competition age limit was reduced from 21 years to 18 years.

Wodonga made three consecutive Ovens & Murray League grand finals, winning in 1967 & 1969 (losing to Corowa Football Club in 1968), coached by former Collingwood Football Club player, Mick Bone and they played in four consecutive grand finals in 1992 (premiers), 1993, 1994 and 1995, but lost the last three.

The club's Thirds / Under 18 side played in eleven consecutive grand finals between 1977 and 1987, winning seven premierships in a period of dominance, when Wodonga was a real powerhouse in the Ovens & Murray League. The Thirds then played in seven consecutive grand finals between 2001 and 2007, winning five.

In 1980, Wodonga Thirds player, Craig Powell (Cleary) was the first O&MFL Under 18 footballer to kick 100 goals in a season.

In 1981, Wodonga achieved the rare feat of winning football premierships in the firsts, seconds and thirds. No other team has done this.

In 1991, the club made, but later withdrew, a bid to join the Victorian Football Association.

In 1993 the Ovens & Murray League introduced a netball competition, with A & B Grade initially.

This short history summary of the Wodonga Football / Netball Club is a continual work in progress.

Football Competitions
Wodonga Football Club have played in the following competitions –
Johnson's Football Association (Donor – Johnson's Waterloo Hotel, Yackandandah)
1896
The Weis Trophy (Donor – Karl Weis' Saloon, Wodonga).
1897
The Alty's Football Trophy Association (Donor – Alty's Royal Hotel, Yackandandah)
1898
The Simons / Loveridge Football Association
1900
Border Football Association
1901 – 1903 & 1906.
Federal Junior Football Association
1903, 1904 & 1905
Wednesday Half Holiday Football Association
1908
Twomey / Stewart Football Association
1909
Chiltern & District Football Association
1912 and 1913
Wodonga District Football Association
1914
Chiltern & District Football Association
1915
World War I, club in recess
1916, 1917 and 1918
Albury & Border Football Association
 1919 to 1923
Chiltern & District Football Association
1924 to 1928 (Wodonga Rovers FC)
Tallangatta & District Football Association
 1929
Chiltern & District Football Association
1930 to 1935
Ovens & Murray Football League
 1936 to 1940
World War II, club in recess
1941 to 1944
Border Football Association
1945
Ovens & Murray Football League
 1946 to present day

Senior Football Premierships
Twomey & Stewart Association Trophy
 1909
Chiltern & District Football Association
 1926, 1933, 1935 – undefeated.
Ovens & Murray Football League (7)
 1967, 1969, 1981, 1987, 1990, 1992, 2004

Senior Football Runners Up
Wednesday Half Holiday Football Association
1908
 Albury Senior Football Association
1911
Chiltern & District Football Association
1912, 1915, 1927 - (minor premiers), 1928, 1931 - (minor premiers), 1934.
Wodonga & District Football Association
1914
Border Football Association
1945
Ovens & Murray Football League 
1939, 1951, 1958, 1960, 1968, 1979, 1984, 1989, 1993, 1994, 1995, 2003

Reserves Football – Premierships
Ovens & Murray Football League (19)
1956, 1957, 1960, 1961, 1969, 1970, 1971, 1979, 1981, 1987, 1989, 1990, 1993, 1994, 1995, 2001, 2004, 2005, 2006.

Reserves Football – Runners Up
Ovens & Murray Football League (10)
1967, 1968, 1976, 1980, 1986, 1988, 1992, 2002, 2009, 2015.

Thirds / Under 18's Premierships
Ovens & Murray Football League 
1977, 1978, 1979, 1981, 1982, 1986, 1987, 1991, 2001, 2005, 2006, 2007,

Thirds / Under 18's Runners Up
Fagan's Trophy (Donor – Chris Fagan – Market Hotel, Albury)
1899
Federal Junior Football Association
1904, 1905
Ovens & Murray Football League 
1975, 1980, 1983, 1984, 1985, 1992, 1995, 2002, 2003, 2015.

Ovens & Murray Football League – Senior Football Best & Fairest Award – Morris Medal Winners
1938: Kelt Emery
1939: Gordon Strang Polled the most votes, with 20, but was suspended by the O&MFL Tribunal during the season, but was presented with a Morris Medal Trophy. Bill Francis (Rutherglen) won with 17 votes.
1940: Gordon Strang
1949: Jack Eames
1952: Norm Webb
1967: Gary Williamson
1989: Brett Allen
1992: Steven Murphy
2016: Matthew Seiter
2019: Jarrod Hodgkin

Ovens & Murray Football League – Reserves Football Best & Fairest Award
Ralph Marks Medal – 1953 to 1970
1956: K Adamson
1958: B McKoy
Leo Burke Medal – 1970 onwards
1976: K Keating
1977: Bruce Calder
1978: Bruce Calder
1983: S Brown
1984: C Reynolds
1992: B Smith
1993: C Baker
2005: G Mathey

Ovens & Murray Football League – Under 18's – Football Best & Fairest

 1975 – Steven Hedley
 1979 – John Pennington
 1982 – Ian McGregor
 2001 – Ryan McEvoy
 2007 – Brenton Olsen

Club Football Best and Fairest Winners

Wodonga FC players who played in the VFL (pre draft)
The following footballers played football with Wodonga, prior to playing senior football in the VFL, with the year indicating their VFL debut.
1941 – Gerald Tanner – Richmond
1954 – Don Star – South Melbourne
1957 – Percy Appleyard – South Melbourne
1957 – Geoff Feehan – St. Kilda
1964 – John Perry – Richmond
1966 – Mike Andrews – Fitzroy
1971 – Vin Doolan – North Melbourne
1976 – Xavier Tanner – North Melbourne & Melbourne
1980 – Danny Murphy – North Melbourne
1983 – Jonathan Collins – North Melbourne & St. Kilda
1983 – Steven Hedley – Sydney Swans
1986 – David Ceglar – North Melbourne
1988 – Michael Garvey – Carlton

Check out the "External Links" section at the bottom of this page for a list of former Wodonga players drafted to an AFL club from 1987 onwards.

VFL / AFL footballers who have come to play at the Wodonga FC

The following footballers have come to play with Wodonga FC, with senior football experience from an VFL / AFL club. The year indicates their debut with Wodonga FC.

 1939 – Gordon Strang – Richmond
 1945 - Dudley Probyn - St. Kilda
 1947 – Jack Eames – Richmond
 1951 – Stan Rule – Melbourne
 1952 - Norm Webb - Footscray
 1954 – Don Calder – Carlton
 1956 - Des Healey - Collingwood
 1961 - Lionel Ryan – Footscray
 1966 – Gary Williamson – Richmond
 1967 – Dick Grimmond – Richmond
 1967 – Mick Bone – Collingwood
 1974 – Ron Montgomery – North Melbourne
 1976 – Frank Hodgkin – St. Kilda
 1980 – Neil Brown – North Melbourne
 1981 – David McLeish – South Melbourne
 1982 – Chris Perry – Collingwood
 1982 - Garry Wheeler - Footscray
 1986 – Jeff Gieschen – Footscray
 1990 – Graeme Cordy – Footscray
 1992 – Mark Stockdale – Richmond
 1993 – Neil Cordy – Footscray & Sydney Swans
 1994 – Dean Harding – Fitzroy
 1994 – Robert Hickmott – Melbourne
 1996 – Darren Dennerman – Geelong & Sydney Swans
 1999 – Leon Higgins – Sydney Swans & Hawthorn
 2003 – Ben Hollands – Richmond
 2004 – Matthew Shir – Adelaide Crows
 2007 – David Antonowicz – West Coast Eagles

References

External links

 

 Facebook page
 This link provides a list of former Wodonga FC players to be drafted by an AFL club from 1987 onwards.

Ovens & Murray Football League clubs
Australian rules football clubs established in 1890
Sports clubs established in 1890
1890 establishments in Australia
Sport in Wodonga
Netball teams in Victoria (Australia)